BootX may refer to:
 BootX (Apple), the default Apple bootloader.
 BootX (Linux), the free Linux bootloader for Macintosh computers.